Comite Creek is a stream in the U.S. states of Louisiana and Mississippi. It is a tributary to the Comite River.

The origin of the name "Comite Creek" is obscure. Comite may be a corruption of the name of Amite as in Amite River. Variant names are "Comite River" and "East Fork Comite River".

References

Rivers of Louisiana
Rivers of Mississippi
Rivers of East Feliciana Parish, Louisiana
Rivers of Amite County, Mississippi
Mississippi placenames of Native American origin